Wilfred Chisholm (23 May 1921 – 1962) was an English professional footballer who played as a goalkeeper.

References

1921 births
1962 deaths
People from Hebburn
Footballers from Tyne and Wear
English footballers
Association football goalkeepers
Newcastle United F.C. players
Grimsby Town F.C. players
Spennymoor United F.C. players
English Football League players